Alexander John Randall, Baron Randall of Uxbridge,  (born 5 August 1955) is a British politician who served as the Member of Parliament (MP) for Uxbridge from 1997 to 2010 and for Uxbridge and South Ruislip until 2015, before being awarded a life peerage in 2018. A member of the Conservative Party, he served as Government Deputy Chief Whip from May 2010 and October 2013, as well as Environment Adviser to Theresa May from 2017 to 2019.

Lord Randall is a trustee and Vice-Chair of the Human Trafficking Foundation and in February 2016 was appointed Special Envoy on modern slavery to the Mayor of London, alongside Anthony Steen.

Early life

Randall's family have lived in Uxbridge for many years. The family owned the major local department store Randalls of Uxbridge on Vine Street, which was founded by his great-grandfather Philip Randall in 1891, and closed in 2015.

Born in Uxbridge, Randall was educated at Rutland House School, an independent school in Hillingdon in the west of Greater London and at Merchant Taylors' School in Moor Park, Hertfordshire. In 1979, he graduated from the School of Slavonic and East European Studies (which is now part of University College London) with an Upper Second Class Honours BA degree in Serbo-Croatian language and literature.

Randall later became managing director of Randall's and one of three shareholders in the business. In 1994, he became Honorary Treasurer of Uxbridge Conservative Association, which later elected him Chairman.

He announced in 2014 that the family store would close, citing decreased turnover and competition from online shopping as causes. Speaking about the closure, he criticised other employers for using zero-hours contracts to cut their costs.

Parliamentary career

House of Commons
Randall was elected Member of Parliament for Uxbridge in a by-election following the death of Sir Michael Shersby in the wake of the Labour Party's 1997 landslide election victory. Randall had been an election agent for Shersby throughout the 1997 General Election campaign. He became the first Conservative candidate to win a parliamentary by-election since the party's recently elected leader William Hague's victory in Richmond in 1989.

During his political career he has sat on the Environment, Transport and Regional Affairs Select Committee and its Environment Sub-Committee. He is strongly against the expansion of Heathrow Airport.

In 1999 he was appointed as an Opposition Whip, but, due to his opposition to Britain's involvement in the Iraq War, he resigned as a matter of conscience in March 2003. He was later reappointed as a Whip in 2003. At the end of 2005 he was promoted to Conservative Assistant Chief Whip. In 2010 he was appointed the joint Deputy Chief Whip and Treasurer of Her Majesty's Household in the Coalition Government.

He was appointed as a Privy Counsellor on 9 June 2010.

He resigned from the government with praise to David Cameron on 6 October 2013, amid a cabinet reshuffle. On 21 October 2013 it was announced that he was to receive a knighthood, having the accolade bestowed by The Prince of Wales on 12 February 2014. On 10 July 2014, Randall announced that he would not be standing as a parliamentary candidate for the seat at the 2015 general election.

House of Lords
On 18 May 2018, it was announced he would be elevated to the House of Lords. On 25 June, he was created a life peer as Baron Randall of Uxbridge, of Uxbridge in the London Borough of Hillingdon.

Outside Parliament
In February 2016 he was appointed Special Envoy on Modern Slavery to the Mayor of London, alongside Anthony Steen CBE.

Personal life
Lord Randall married Katherine Frances Gray in 1986; the couple have two sons and a daughter. Randall is a keen supporter of Uxbridge Football Club and Saracens Rugby Club.

References

External links
 John Randall MP Official website
  Biography- House of Lords
 John Randall General Election 2010 Campaign site for Uxbridge and South Ruislip Constituency
 Guardian Unlimited Politics – Ask Aristotle: John Randall MP
 TheyWorkForYou.com – John Randall MP
 

1955 births
Living people
Conservative Party (UK) life peers
Life peers created by Elizabeth II
Conservative Party (UK) MPs for English constituencies
UK MPs 1997–2001
UK MPs 2001–2005
UK MPs 2005–2010
People educated at Merchant Taylors' School, Northwood
Alumni of University College London
Alumni of the UCL School of Slavonic and East European Studies
Alumni of the University of London
UK MPs 2010–2015
Knights Bachelor
Members of the Privy Council of the United Kingdom